Leslie S. G. Kovasznay (14 April 1918, Budapest – 17 April 1980) was a Hungarian-American engineer, known as one of the world's leading experts in turbulent flow research.

Kovasznay earned in 1943 his doctorate in engineering at the Royal Hungarian Institute of Technology in the laboratory of Előd Abody-Anderlik in the Faculty of Mechanical Engineering. After working from 1941 to 1946 at that Faculty, he spent a year at the Cavendish Laboratory working with Sir Geoffrey Taylor. From 1947 to 1978 Kovasznay was a faculty member of the Aeronautics Department organized by Francis H. Clauser (1913–2013) at Johns Hopkins University (JHU). In December he resigned from JHU to become a professor of mechanical engineering at the University of Houston, where he remained in his professorship until his sudden death in 1980.

In the 1970s, he worked with Hajime Fujita on experimental studies of interactions between airfoils and wake turbulence and, with Chih-Ming Ho, on experimental studies of interactions between sound and turbulence.

He travelled widely, lectured at many universities and conferences, and made extended visits in France and Japan. He was the author or coauthor of more than 80 papers. He was a Guggenheim Fellow for the academic year 1955–1956. He was elected a Fellow of the American Physical Society in 1962.

Kovasznay married in 1944. Upon his death, he was survived by his widow and their daughter.

Selected publications
 1948
 1948
 1949
 1950
 1953
 1953
 1955
 1958
 1968
 1969
 1969
 1970
 1972
 1972

See also
Kovasznay flow

References

1918 births
1980 deaths
20th-century American physicists
Aerodynamicists
Budapest University of Technology and Economics alumni
Fellows of the American Physical Society
Fluid dynamicists
Hungarian aerospace engineers
Hungarian emigrants to the United States
20th-century Hungarian physicists
20th-century Hungarian inventors
Johns Hopkins University faculty
Musicians from Budapest
20th-century American inventors
University of Houston faculty